General elections were held in Japan on 10 August 1902. The result was a victory for the Rikken Seiyūkai party, which won 191 of the 376 seats.

Electoral system
Electoral reforms in 1900 had abolished the 253 single and two-member constituencies. The 376 members of the House of Representatives were now elected in 51 multi-member constituencies based on prefectures and cities.

Voting remained restricted to men aged over 25 who paid at least 10 yen a year in direct taxation, although 1900 electoral reforms had reduced the figure from 15 yen, increasing the proportion of the population able to vote from 1% to 2%.

Results

References

General elections in Japan
Japan
1902 elections in Japan
August 1902 events
Election and referendum articles with incomplete results